The Frank Isakson Prize for Optical Effects in Solids is a prize that has been awarded every second year by the American Physical Society since 1980. The recipient is chosen for "outstanding optical research that leads to breakthroughs in the condensed matter sciences.". The prize is named after Frank Isakson, and as of 2007 it is valued at $5,000.

Recipients 
Source:  American Physical Society
 2020: Robert W. Boyd and Vladimir M. Shalaev
 2018: Andrea Cavalleri and Keith A. Nelson
 2016: David Burnham Tanner and Dirk van der Marel
 2014: Naomi Halas, Peter Nordlander, and Tony Heinz
 2012: Dmitri Basov
 2010: Duncan G. Steel
 2008: Joseph Orenstein and Zeev Valentine Vardeny
 2006: Roberto Merlin
 2004: James Wolfe
 2002: James W. Allen and Thomas Timusk
 2000: Paul Linford Richards
 1998: Yuen-Ron Shen
 1996: David E. Aspnes
 1994: Anant K. Ramdas
 1992: Paul A. Fleury
 1990: Miles V. Klein
 1988: Albert J. Sievers
 1986: Elias Burstein
 1984: Manuel Cardona
 1982: Jan Tauc
 1980: David L. Dexter

See also
 List of physics awards

External links 
 Frank Isakson Prize for Optical Effects in Solids, American Physical Society

Awards of the American Physical Society
Condensed matter physics awards